Voces a mi Alrededor is a 1993 album by Franco De Vita released on the Sony label. The CD produced "Cálido y Frío," a Top 10 hit on the Billboard Latin music charts. Lesser hits from the disc include "Y Te Pienso" and "Los Hijos de la Oscuridad."

Track listing
  Que no muera la esperanza
  Mi amigo Sebastián
  Y Te Pienso
  Cálido y Frío (acoustic version)
  Con un poco de ti
  Voces a mi alrededor
  Cálido y Frío (pop version)
  Sin tanto espacio
  La misma persona
 Los Hijos De La Oscuridad
 Otoño

1993 albums
Franco De Vita albums